Serine/threonine-protein kinase 24 is an enzyme that in humans is encoded by the STK24 gene located in the chromosome 13, band q32.2. It is also known as Mammalian STE20-like protein kinase 3 (MST-3). The protein is 443 amino acids long and its mass is 49 kDa.

Classification and discovery 

The yeast 'Sterile 20' gene (STE20) functions upstream of the mitogen-activated protein kinase (MAPK) cascade. In mammals, protein kinases related to STE20 can be divided into 2 subfamilies based on their structure and regulation. Members of the PAK subfamily (see PAK3) contain a C-terminal catalytic domain and an N-terminal regulatory domain that has a CDC42-binding domain. In contrast, members of the GCK subfamily (MAP4K2), also called the Sps1 subfamily, have an N-terminal catalytic domain and a C-terminal regulatory domain without a CDC42-binding domain. STK24 belongs to the GCK subfamily of STE20-like kinases.

The sterile 20 protein was first found in yeast. The MST-20 related kinases family is growing, having 28 members divided into two groups - p21-activated kinase and germinal center kinase (GCK) families. STK24 belongs to the germinal center kinase (GCK) III subfamily of sterile 20 kinases.

Function 

Kinases of GCKIII subfamily are involved in regulation of multiple functions of the cells and interaction with programmed cell death 10 (CCM3). CCM is a pathological vascular situation that, influencing the blood vessels in central nervous system (CNS), may cause stroke, seizure and even cerebral hemorrhage. It has been shown that STK24 and STK25 operate in the same cardiovascular development pathway with CCM3. According to the results of the experiment by Zhang et al., lack of STK24 has no effect on the amount of neutrophils or leucocytes, as well as it does not affect the chemotaxis of neutrophils. Zhang et al. also the interaction between STK24 and CCM. Using tandem affinity purification with mass spectrometry, they found that CCM3 is the main protein that binds to STK24 in HEK293 cells.

STK24 operates on serine and threonine residues and, as a response to oxidative stress and caspase activity, develops cell death.

STK24 is activated by autophosphorylation at Thr-190 and phosphorylation at this site is essential for its function. Phosphorylation by protein kinase A activates the isoform B of STK24.

The mutagenesis of four residues in STK24 have been carried out. In position 18, the replacement of threonine (T) with alanine (A) causes the reduction of phosphorylation by PKA. the modification in positions 65, where lysine (K) is replaced with A, and the position 190, where T is replaced with A, affects the activity and autophosphorylation. In residue 321, the change of aspartic acid (D) to Asparagine (N) reveals as loss of proteolytic cleavage by caspases. Those residues may play an important role apoptotic signal transduction.

Structure and tissue distribution 
STK24 has two subunits, 36kDa N-terminal subunit and 12 kDa C-terminal subunit. In the cells, STK24 is located in nucleus and less in cytoplasm and membrane. There are two isoforms of the protein, isoform A is ubiquitous and is expressed in 237 organs, isoform B is expressed in brain hippocampus and cerebral cortex.

Interactions 

STK24 has been shown to interact with PDCD10, TRAF3IP3, STRN3, MOBKL3, STRN, SLMAP, PPP2R1A, CTTNBP2NL, FAM40A and STRN4.

References

Further reading 

 
 
 
 
 
 

Biology of bipolar disorder